Great Celebrations square is the main square for public celebrations in Baghdad with a stadium for the heads of the state in the center of the Parade avenue. The square is home to three important public monuments created by leading mid-20th century sculptors.

Description
In 1986 (two years before the war's end) the Iraqi Ba'athist government began construction of a festival and parade ground in Zawra Park, near the extensive presidential complex in the center of Baghdad.
The square is located near the Harthiya and in the fortified Green Zone, and the site was specifically selected for its symbolic value. Iraqis generally believe it is the same location where the Muslim Arabs defeated the Persians in 636 CE and this historic event is seen to be the beginning of Islamic domination of the region. The site was intended to become the place where military parades and national events would be held. Known as Grand Festivities Square, it comprised a large parade ground, an extensive review pavilion and a large reflecting pool. The surrounding grassy areas hosted Iraqis during military parades. Adding to the festive appeal of the grounds were three refreshments booths that sold ice cream, cold beverages, and candy.

The then leader of Iraq, Saddam Hussein commissioned three major public artworks for the area. These artworks were to be memorials to Iraq's fallen soldiers, a remembrance of Iraq's pain and suffering as a consequence of the Iran-Iraq war and symbols of Iraq's victory in the war. The Monument to the Unknown Soldier, based on a concept by Iraqi sculptor, Khaled al-Rahal, and situated just beyond the perimeter of the square, had already opened in 1982. Another major work, the colossal, Al-Shaheed Monument designed by Iraqi sculptor, Ismail Fatah Al Turk, and situated on the river bank had been inaugurated in 1983. Hussein commissioned a third monument, the Victory Arches, another concept by the sculptor, Khaled Al-Rahal, to be built in the same vicinity and it was inaugurated in 1989.

The Victory Arches mark the entrances to the square.  On the day the arches were dedicated (8 August, 1989), Saddam rode under the arches astride a white horse.  It is generally acknowledged that Hussein intended to cast an allusion to the slain Shiite martyr Hussein, killed in Karbala in 680 CE, whose death caused the rift between Shiite and Sunni Muslims.  The monument, although presenting a triumphalist narrative in relation to the Iran-Iraq war, has assumed a broader symbolism and represents those Iraqis who fell in any war throughout the country's history.

The three monuments in the vicinity of the square form a visual and symbolic unit.  The construction of the three artworks was part of a broader Ba'athist government program to beautify Baghdad, instil a sense of national pride, and at the same time immortalise Sadam Hussein's reputation as a powerful leader.

Recent developments
The Square has become a place for public demonstrations and protests. In April–May, 2016, following a protracted political struggle between to end sectarianism in politics, a large crowd gathered at Grand Festivities Square in a non-violent protest.

See also 
 Baghdad's sights and monuments
 Culture of Iraq
 Iraqi art
 The Monument to the Unknown Soldier
 Victory Arch
 Al-Shaheed Monument

References

External links 
 Great Celebrations square on WikiMapia

1986 establishments in Iraq
Anti-Iranian sentiments
Anti-national sentiment
Baghdad
Buildings and structures in Baghdad
Iraqi art
Iran–Iraq War
Monuments and memorials in Iraq
Museum districts
Squares in Iraq
Triumphal arches